Calanoida is an order of copepods, a group of arthropods commonly found as zooplankton. The order includes around 46 families with about 1800 species of both marine and freshwater copepods between them.

Description 
Calanoids can be distinguished from other planktonic copepods by having first antennae at least half the length of the body and biramous second antennae. However, their most distinctive anatomical trait is the presence of a joint between the fifth and sixth body segments.

Classification 
The order Calanoida contains the following families:

 Acartiidae
 Aetideidae
 Arctokonstantinidae
 Arietellidae
 Augaptilidae
 Bathypontiidae
 Calanidae
 Candaciidae
 Centropagidae
 Clausocalanidae
 Diaixidae
 Diaptomidae
 Discoidae
 Epacteriscidae
 Eucalanidae
 Euchaetidae
 Fosshageniidae
 Heterorhabdidae
 Hyperbionycidae
 Kyphocalanidae
 Lucicutiidae
 Megacalanidae
 Mesaiokeratidae
 Metridinidae
 Nullosetigeridae
 Paracalanidae
 Parapontellidae
 Parkiidae
 Phaennidae
 Pontellidae
 Pseudocyclopidae 
 Pseudocyclopiidae
 Pseudodiaptomidae
 Rhincalanidae
 Rostrocalanidae
 Ryocalanidae
 Scolecitrichidae
 Spinocalanidae
 Stephidae
 Subeucalanidae
 Sulcanidae
 Temoridae
 Tharybidae
 Tortanidae

Ecology 
Calanoid copepods are the dominant animals in the plankton in many parts of the world's oceans, making up 55–95% of plankton samples. They are therefore important in many food webs, taking in energy from phytoplankton and algae and 'repackaging' it for consumption by higher trophic level predators. Many commercial fish are dependent on calanoid copepods for diet in either their larval or adult forms. Baleen whales such as bowhead whales, sei whales, right whales and fin whales rely substantially on calanoid copepods as a food source.

References

External links 

 Calanoida fact sheet – guide to the marine zooplankton of south eastern Australia
 Classification of Calanoida
 Key to calanoid copepod families

 
Crustacean orders